Zajdel is a Polish-language surname, a Polish phonetic rendering of the surname Seidel.

The surname may refer to:

Janusz Zajdel (1938–1985), Polish science fiction author, second in popularity in Poland after Stanisław Lem
Saulie Zajdel, Canadian politician

See also
Janusz A. Zajdel Award, often called just Zajdel, the annual award for Polish science fiction and fantasy

Polish-language surnames

de:Zajdel